Aliabad (also Romanized as ‘Alīābād) is a village in Bala Deh Rural District, Beyram District, Larestan County, Fars Province, Iran. At the 2006 census, its population was 101, in 23 families.

References 

Populated places in Larestan County